Sumbul Iqbal Khan (Urdu: سنبل اقبال خان; born 30 August 1990) is a Pakistani television actress. She is best known for her leading roles in Meray Khwab Raiza Raiza (2011), Kis Din Mera Viyah Howay Ga 2 (2012), Raju Rocket (2012), Rukhsaar (2013), Aik Pal (2014), Tumsay Mil Kay (2015), and Aik Thi Rania (2017). Iqbal was last seen as an antagonist in ARY Digital's Mein Hari Piya (2021).

Life and career 
Sumbul Iqbal Khan was born in Karachi, Sindh. he is noted for playing a variety of characters in dramas, including ARY Digital's series Roag (2011), which was critically successful. She later appeared in Hum TV's Mere Khwab Raiza Raiza (2012) opposite Syed Jibran.

Filmography

Television

Films

Awards and nominations

References

External links 

Living people
Actresses from Karachi
Pakistani female models
Pakistani television actresses
Hum Award winners
21st-century Pakistani actresses
1992 births